Nightwish is a Finnish symphonic metal band from Kitee. The band was formed in 1996 by lead songwriter and keyboardist Tuomas Holopainen, guitarist Emppu Vuorinen, and former lead singer Tarja Turunen. The band soon picked up drummer Jukka Nevalainen, and then bassist Sami Vänskä after the release of their debut album, Angels Fall First (1997). In 2001, Vänskä was replaced by Marko Hietala, who also took over the male vocalist role previously filled by Holopainen or guest singers.

Although Nightwish have been prominent in their home country since Angels Fall First, they did not achieve wider success until the release of the albums Oceanborn (1998), Wishmaster (2000) and Century Child (2002). Their 2004 album, Once, has sold more than one million copies and was the band's breakthrough in the United States. Their biggest US hit single, "Wish I Had an Angel" (2004), received MTV airplay and was included on three US film soundtracks to promote their North American tour. The band produced three more singles and two music videos for Once, as well as a re-recording of "Sleeping Sun" for the compilation album, Highest Hopes: The Best of Nightwish (2005), before Turunen's dismissal in October 2005. Her last performance with Nightwish was during a concert recorded for the live album/DVD End of an Era. After the concert, the other members informed Turunen with an open letter that she was no longer a member of Nightwish.

In May 2007, Nightwish announced Anette Olzon as Turunen's replacement. That September, the band released their sixth album, Dark Passion Play, which has sold almost 2 million copies. The album's lead single, "Amaranth", became one of Nightwish's most successful in Europe. The supporting tour, one of the band's largest, started on October 6, 2007, and ended on September 19, 2009. The band released an EP/live album, Made in Hong Kong (And in Various Other Places), in March 2009 as a CD/DVD, and their seventh studio album, Imaginaerum, was released globally on various days in late 2011/early 2012.

On October 1, 2012, Nightwish announced that they had parted ways with Olzon and would be finishing the tour with at that time ReVamp vocalist (ex-After Forever) Floor Jansen. In October 2013, Nightwish made Jansen and longtime session uilleann pipes player Troy Donockley permanent members of the band, and they were featured in the acclaimed album Endless Forms Most Beautiful, released on March 27, 2015. From 2014 to 2019, Nevalainen, while still a member of the band, was inactive due to severe insomnia issues; in July 2019, he announced that he would not be returning to the band, with Kai Hahto, who had acted as his replacement since 2014 (including by performing all drums on Endless Forms Most Beautiful), being promoted as the official drummer, and is featured as such at the ninth album, Human. :II: Nature., which was released internationally on April 10, 2020. After twenty years of performing with the band, it was announced that bassist Marko Hietala had parted ways with the band in January 2021. Jukka Koskinen was announced as Hietala's replacement to play bass during the tour. In August 2022, he was announced as a permanent member of the band.

Nightwish is the third-best-selling band and musical entity in Finland with certified sales of nearly 900,000 certified copies. The group is also the most successful Finnish band worldwide, selling more than 10 million records and receiving more than 60 gold and platinum awards, having released six Number 1 albums and thirteen Number 1 singles. On October 26, 2018, Nightwish was inducted into the Finnish Music Hall of Fame, becoming the honorary gallery's 11th member.

History

Formation (1996)

After playing keyboards in several heavy metal bands in the 1990s, including Darkwoods My Betrothed, Tuomas Holopainen decided to create his own project while sitting around a campfire with friends on July 6, 1996. He immediately had a clear idea of the music: experimental acoustic music he had written himself during his time in the Finnish Army, similar to the music usually played around campfires, but with a distinct sound and atmosphere and played on his keyboards.

He soon invited friend and schoolmate Erno "Emppu" Vuorinen to play acoustic guitars, and the classical vocalist Tarja Turunen, who had shared the same music teacher, Plamen Dimov, a few years earlier. The three musicians recorded their self-titled acoustic demo in late 1996. The name "Nightwish" was derived from their first song together – the demo also included the song "The Forever Moments", and an early version of "Etiäinen".

Debut album and first tour (1997–1998)

In early 1997, following the release of their demo, Jukka "Julius" Nevalainen joined the band, and acoustic guitar was replaced with electric guitar. The addition of heavy metal elements to the band's existing experimental style gave the band a different sound, forming the core of the Nightwish sound.

The band entered the studio in April 1997 to record seven songs for their second demo, Angels Fall First. In May 1997, the demo made its way to the Finnish record label Spinefarm Records, who wanted to release it as the band's debut album of the same name. The label offered Nightwish a record deal, and the band returned to the studio to record four more songs to accompany the tracks of the demo. The full-length album was released in November 1997 and reached number 31 on the Finnish album charts, with the single "The Carpenter" reaching number 3 on the Finnish singles chart. "The Carpenter" single was released as a split with label mates Children of Bodom and Thy Serpent; the album is also one of the two releases which features Holopainen's vocals, appearing on four of the album's eleven tracks alongside Turunen's.

The band made their live debut in their hometown Kitee at the Huvikeskus on December 31, 1997, in front of 400 people. The band recalled being both nervous and terrified when performing for the first time. Since they were missing a bass player, Samppa Hirvonen joined them as a sessional live member. Marianna Pellinen was also a sessional live member as an additional keyboard player and a backing vocalist for Turunen. There were plans to make Hirvonen a permanent member, but he joined the army as part of Finnish army conscription just as they began recording Oceanborn, so they asked Sami Vänskä to join instead, since Tuomas knew him from the band Nattvindens Gråt. During early 1998, the band performed, sometimes opening for bands Babylon Whores, Children of Bodom and Tarot. The band performed only seven shows because at the time, Turunen was finishing her schooling, and Nevalainen and Vuorinen were serving their obligatory Finnish military service.

International success (1998–2000)

Nightwish returned to the studio in August 1998 as a five-piece to record their follow-up album for Spinefarm Records. On October 7, 1998, Nightwish released their second full-length album, Oceanborn, in Finland only. Adopting a more technical and progressive sound than Angels Fall First, Oceanborn saw the band abandon much of the ambient and folk elements present on their debut release, with the exception of the song "Moondance". In contrast to the female vocals of Turunen, the album also featured guest growling vocals by Tapio Wilska (ex-Finntroll), since Tuomas did not want to sing again. Wilska is also a former member of Nattvindens Gråt.

AllMusic review said that the album "as a whole works great", with songs that are "very strong". Oceanborn was an instant success in Finland, reaching number 5 on the Finnish album charts. The album's first single, "Sacrament of Wilderness", hit number 1 on the Finnish singles charts, where it stayed for several weeks. The album's release was initially limited to Finland, but because of the success of "Sacrament of Wilderness", Spinefarm released Oceanborn internationally in the spring of 1999. In May 1999, Nightwish recorded the single "Sleeping Sun (Four Ballads of the Eclipse)", and in one month the single sold 15,000 copies in Germany alone. Following the band's first international success, Nightwish was added as the opening band for Rage's 1999 European tour. Both the album Oceanborn and the singles "Sacrament of Wilderness" and "Walking in the Air" were certified gold in Finland in August 1999.

While in the studio in early 2000 working on their third album, Nightwish was accepted in the Finnish Eurovision Song Contest preselection final with the song "Sleepwalker". Despite winning the public vote, Nightwish eventually finished in third place, with the jury choosing local gospel singer Nina Åström to represent Finland.

On May 19, 2000, Nightwish released their third studio album Wishmaster. This debuted at No. 1 on the Finnish album charts, and was certified gold in Finland after three weeks at number one. Critical response to the album was mixed, with Allmusic citing the album as repetitive, and saying "as a whole album, it can be a little annoying, even frustrating". However, German magazine Rock Hard declared Wishmaster "Album of the Month", despite competing against long-awaited May releases from Iron Maiden and Bon Jovi. Following the release of Wishmaster, Nightwish embarked on their first world tour, playing dates in South America, Mexico, Canada, and the first headlining European tour with Sinergy and Eternal Tears of Sorrow. In the summer, the band returned to Europe, appearing at the Wacken Open Air festival and the Biebop Metal Fest.

New bassist and symphonic elements (2001–2003)

In 2001, Nightwish recorded a cover of Gary Moore's "Over the Hills and Far Away" together with two new songs ("10th Man Down", unreleased from Oceanborn sessions, and "Away", unreleased from Wishmaster sessions) and a remake of "Astral Romance" (from the Angels Fall First album) with Tony Kakko (Sonata Arctica) singing Tuomas' part. This new material was released as their first (and until 2009 the only) EP, Over the Hills and Far Away.

The record also included guest performances by Tapio Wilska once again on "10th Man Down". Nightwish's version of "Over the Hills and Far Away" was well received by fans, becoming a frequent part of the band's live performances, but the other songs never had a great break-through and have not been re-released, with the exception of a live performance of "10th Man Down" on the End of Innocence DVD with Marko Hietala. In the same year, they also released (as VHS, DVD and CD) their first live album, From Wishes to Eternity, recorded during a show in Tampere, Finland, on December 29, 2000.

Soon after the release of Over the Hills and Far Away, Nightwish met what has been described as one of their hardest points as a band. The issues centered on the bassist, Sami Vänskä, who had started misbehaving towards the band, according to Holopainen, by missing appointments and failing to take gigs as seriously as the other members did. After the band discussed his behavior with Vänskä several times, without getting any change, everyone simply stopped caring and tensions grew. Meanwhile, guitarist Emppu Vuorinen had started complaining about his role in the band, feeling like "a hired gun who would only do what he's asked to". According to their music teacher, Plamen Dimov, he and Holopainen have totally different characters, and thus difficulties were expected to arise. But Vuorinen was told to stay cool and "bite the bullet", and the problem was never addressed again.

Later, Holopainen confessed that, at that time, he seriously started thinking about breaking Nightwish up. After a gig in Russia, he sent a text message to fellow musician Tony Kakko of metal band Sonata Arctica, telling him that he did not think he had a band any longer, and asking him what plans he had for next year. After Nightwish's last gig for the Over the Hills and Far Away tour in 2001, Holopainen called their labels Drakkar and Spinefarm, unofficially declaring Nightwish was over. He told them he might produce another album, but he'd never perform another show with the band. The same message was also written on the band's message board.

Straight after the last gig, Holopainen went on a week-long hiking trip to Lapland with Tony Kakko. During the hiking trip, they talked about the band and Holopainen decided he could not break up Nightwish that easily. When he returned from Lapland he immediately received a phone call from Ewo Pohjola, CEO of Spinefarm, offering himself to become their manager and help him straighten things up, and Holopainen agreed.

To continue with Nightwish, Holopainen decided some changes were in order. Beside choosing Ewo as their new manager, he also asked Vänskä to leave the band. He would later cite musical differences as another reason for the breakup. Marko Hietala (Tarot) was asked to replace Vänskä, effectively leaving his previous band, Sinergy. In addition to playing bass guitar, Hietala would also perform male vocals. Holopainen has since said publicly that he and Vänskä still keep in touch, contrary to rumours saying that they have not met since. However, they are not interested in making another project together.

In 2002, Nightwish released Century Child, along with the singles "Ever Dream" and "Bless the Child". The main difference from previous albums is the use of a live Finnish orchestra on the tracks "Bless the Child", "Ever Dream", "Feel For You" and "The Beauty of the Beast". But an enduring favorite of fans is the band's version of "The Phantom of the Opera", from the famous musical of the same name by composer Andrew Lloyd Webber. The song was repeatedly played in concerts until vocalist Tarja Turunen was replaced with Anette Olzon, whereupon the band announced that they would never play the song live again.

Century Child was certified gold two hours after its release, and platinum two weeks afterwards. It set a record on the Finnish album charts as well: Never before had a first place album been so distant from the second place. After the "Bless the Child" music video, a second one was recorded, without any single support. The chosen track was "End of All Hope". The clip contains pieces from the Finnish movie, Kohtalon kirja (English: The Book of Fate).

In 2003, Nightwish released their second DVD, the documentary End of Innocence. It tells the story of the band in Holopainen, Nevalainen and Tapio Wilska's words for two hours. The documentary also features bits of live concerts, exclusive footage, etc. Vocalist Tarja Turunen got married during the summer of 2003, and there were rumours that the band was about to be dissolved. These rumors were, at the time, proven to be false, as the band continued to play concerts for another year and released another album. Tarja's marriage later played a part in her dismissal from the band in the autumn of 2005.

Chart-topping success of Once and Turunen's dismissal (2004–2005)

A new album, Once, was released on June 7, 2004, along with its first single, "Nemo". The single topped the charts in Finland and Hungary, and reached the charts in six additional countries. "Nemo" remains the band's most successful single release to date.

Once utilizes a full orchestra in nine of the eleven songs on the album. Unlike Century Child, Nightwish decided to look for an orchestra outside of Finland this time, choosing the London Philharmonic Orchestra. It is also their second album to feature a full-length song in Finnish, "Kuolema Tekee Taiteilijan" (English: "Death Makes an Artist"). Once has sold triple platinum in Finland, platinum in Germany, and Gold in 6 other countries, it also reached No. 1 in the Greek, Norwegian and German album charts, and charted the Top 10 in France, Hungary and Sweden. The following singles were: "Wish I Had an Angel" (featured on the soundtrack of the film Alone in the Dark), "Kuolema Tekee Taiteilijan" (released only in Finland and Japan) and "The Siren". Besides the commercial success, Once was also well received by critics, with many positive reviewers drawing comparisons with Oceanborn.

On top of all this, the production cost of "Once," totaled approximately 250,000 euros (over 1,000,000 including video production) making it Finland's most expensive recording in history. Though, the band would go on to break this record again later in their career.

The success of the album allowed them to perform the Once Upon a Tour, taking them to play in many countries the band had never visited before. Nightwish performed at the opening ceremony of the 2005 World Championships in Athletics, held in Helsinki, highlighting the acclaim the band had gained. A "best of" album, Highest Hopes, was released in September 2005. The compilation also featured a live cover "High Hopes" (from the Pink Floyd album The Division Bell). Besides "High Hopes", a remake of "Sleeping Sun" (from Oceanborn) was included on the album and released as a single. A video for the remake was shot, featuring a medieval battle, and can be found on the German release of the single and as a separate DVD released by Spinefarm.

The four other members of Nightwish had decided that it was best to continue Nightwish without Turunen. After a concert in the Hartwall Areena (Helsinki) on October 21, 2005, recorded for the live DVD End of an Era (released June 2006), they expressed their decision through an open letter which was given to Turunen by Holopainen, and afterwards posted on the band's website. It was written by Holopainen and signed by all four band members. The main justification given in the letter for Turunen's dismissal was that the band felt that both her husband Marcelo Cabuli (an Argentine businessman) and commercial interests had changed her attitude towards the band.

Turunen responded to the incident twice, during press conferences in Finland and Germany, saying that her dismissal came entirely as a shock to her, given that she had not been notified before the letter was given to her. She felt that the personal attacks on her husband were unwarranted, and that playing the issue out in public was "senselessly cruel". She expressed these feelings through her own open letter, which was published on her personal website, and through various TV, magazine, and newspaper interviews.

Hiatus, arrival of Anette Olzon and Dark Passion Play (2006–2009)

To find a replacement for Turunen as the female vocalist of the band, on March 17, 2006, the band allowed vocalists interested for the position to send in demo tapes as an audition for the spot. During this time, speculation began to emerge about who would eventually be chosen and the band stated on their website that fans should not believe any source other than the band itself for information regarding the new vocalist. In the end, the 35-year-old Alyson Avenue's ex-lead singer, Anette Olzon, from Sweden, was chosen.

In September 2006, the band entered the studio to record their sixth studio album, Dark Passion Play. In May, next year, Anette Olzon was announced to replace Turunen. Holopainen has said in interviews that he did not wish to reveal her identity until new material was available because he did not want fans judging her by nothing more than a picture, or past work.
The day after this revealing, May 25, 2007, charity single "Eva" was released for download only as the first offering from the new album, and the first featuring Olzon. It was originally scheduled for release on 30 May, but the date was changed because of a leak on a British music download site. On June 13, Nightwish revealed the title and artwork for the new album on their official website, as well as the name and cover of the second single (this time CD), "Amaranth"; it was released in Finland on August 22 and included a bonus track entitled "While Your Lips Are Still Red" written by Tuomas as the main theme track for the upcoming Finnish feature film "Lieksa!". The single achieved gold status in Finland after less than two days in stores.

Dark Passion Play was released around Europe in the last week of September 2007, in the UK on October 1 and the United States on October 2. It was awarded double platinum in Finland the second day after its release and took the number one position on the charts of Germany, Finland, Switzerland, Hungary and Croatia and got in top 100 in other 16 countries, including the United States.

"Dark Passion Play," also broke the band's previous record for Finland's most expensive recording, with the final production cost of the audio recording coming in at over 500,000 euros (twice the cost of "Once," the previous record-setter, and approximately $675,000.)

On this album, male vocalist Marko Hietala had more freedom in the use of his voice: he sings back up in the songs "Cadence of Her Last Breath" and "Sahara", lead vocals in the songs "The Islander", "Master Passion Greed" and "While Your Lips Are Still Red" and chorus in the songs "Bye Bye Beautiful" and "7 Days to the Wolves". He also sings one part in "The Poet and the Pendulum", besides singing back up in the chorus. Before the band found the new singer and the album was recorded, Marko sang on all the demo versions. Holopainen also sang on the demo versions of "Bye Bye Beautiful" and "Master Passion Greed" but these songs have never been released.

On September 22, 2007, the band hosted a secret concert at Rock Café in Tallinn, Estonia, disguising itself as a Nightwish cover band called "Nachtwasser". Their first official concert with Olzon was in Tel Aviv, Israel, on October 6, 2007. The Dark Passion Play tour thus started, visiting the United States, Canada, most of Europe, Asia, and Australia.

The third single of the album was "Erämaan viimeinen", a previously unreleased vocal version of the instrumental "Last of the Wilds". It was released in Finland only on December 5, 2007. On this song, Jonsu of the Finnish pop and rock band Indica performs the Finnish vocals. "Bye Bye Beautiful", the fourth single, was released on February 15, 2008, and concerns the 2005 dismissal of Turunen, as does one other song on the album (Master Passion Greed). The single includes yet another bonus track, "Escapist", which is also included on the Japanese version of Dark Passion Play. Within a week after the release, the fifth single was announced to be "The Islander". It was released over a month after the release of its music video, shot in late 2007 in Rovaniemi in Finnish Lapland.

The Dark Passion Play tour turned out to be Nightwish's longest tour yet, lasting from late 2007 to September 2009 when it ended with a concert in Hartwall Arena – the band's second concert there – with the band Apocalyptica.

On March 6, 2009, Nightwish released a new live EP/DVD entitled Made in Hong Kong (And in Various Other Places). The eight live tracks were recorded during the "Dark Passion Play World Tour" in 2007–2008, and the album also includes one b-side from the "Bye Bye Beautiful" single, one b-side from the "Amaranth" single, a previously unreleased demo version of "Cadence of Her Last Breath", and a bonus-DVD with three music videos as well as a 37-minute documentary called Back in the Day is Now.

Imaginaerum and Olzon's dismissal (2009–2012)

In the June 2009 edition of the Finnish magazine Soundi, Holopainen stated that he had started work on a new Nightwish album. In October 2009, rumors about the new album's name were going around with the title Wind Embraced, but lead vocalist Anette Olzon listed the rumors as "not true" and said that the songs for the new album had not yet been completed apart from three songs written before May 2009. Holopainen said in a 2010 interview that "[...]I can't reveal to you any more but there is going to be a big twist so to say, on the next album." In an interview with Uilleann piper Troy Donockley (who recorded with the band on Dark Passion Play), when asked about his involvement in the new album, he stated "Oh yes, I will be playing on the next album and from what Tuomas has told me, it is going to be something extraordinary..."

On February 1, 2010, Olzon stated on her blog that Holopainen had nine songs ready for the new album. In April 2010, Holopainen revealed on the Nightwish homepage that he had finished writing the songs, and on June 2, it was announced that he had finished recording the pre-production demo.

The band announced in late 2010 that more information on the album's actual content would be released in late January, but on February 1, the official website bore a statement written by Holopainen that because of the schedule changes he can't yet give away as many details as he would have wanted, but more information will be out after a couple of months. He added, however, that "it still is the Burton-Gaiman-Dalí – amusement park we are about to enter". In the same statement, it was revealed that the album would be a theme album and "mood changes seem to be more present than ever before", and the orchestration demos he had received from Pip Williams were described as "beautiful, twisted, tribal and cinematic stuff". In the Finnish version of the statement, it was also revealed that a few songs will not get any orchestrations at all, differing from their latest album on which all songs had the background orchestra.

Announcements continued throughout 2011. On February 10, Nightwish announced on their website that the new album title would be Imaginaerum. They also declared that the band had been preparing a movie based on the album, which would be released in 2012 and directed by Stobe Harju, who previously directed the music video for "The Islander". On August 22, 2011, it was announced on the band's official website that the album of Imaginaerum would be released at the end of the year. On August 31, Nightwish announced on its website the decision to change Imaginarium title to Imaginaerum "to avoid mix-ups with various things named 'Imaginarium'". On September 2, the group announced on its website that the new single called "Storytime" would be released on Friday, November 11, and on September 9, Nightwish revealed the cover and tracklist.

On January 11, 2012, Nightwish announced on its website that the second single, "The Crow, the Owl and the Dove", would be released on February 29. Roadrunner Records announced that Nightwish would be releasing a 10-inch LP titled Trials of Imaginaerum in conjunction with Record Store Day (April 21, 2012). The 10-inch LP is a two-sided picture disk that contains four early demos of "Storytime", "The Crow, The Owl and The Dove", "I Want My Tears Back" and "Slow, Love, Slow".

On October 1, 2012, Nightwish announced via its Facebook page that they were parting ways with Olzon. According to the press statement, "it has become increasingly obvious that the direction and the needs of the band were in conflict, and this has led to a division from which we cannot recover". This announcement came days after Olzon fell ill at a show in Denver, Colorado, and was unable to perform. Nightwish used replacement singers from the opening band, Kamelot, and Olzon later expressed her disappointment, saying "I was never asked if it was okay that they used Elize and Alissa in the show [Friday] night [...] I don't think it's a good decision they made and I'm sorry for those of you who came to see the whole band but got something else. But I was very ill and this decision wasn't mine." According to the statement, Dutch singer Floor Jansen (ex-After Forever, ReVamp) would sing for the remainder of the Imaginaerum World Tour.

On January 11, 2013, Olzon announced on her official blog that she was pregnant with her third child, due in spring 2013, which she claimed was a contributing factor to her being dismissed. The band then released a statement on its website counterclaiming that the reason Olzon gave for her dismissal and other statements she made were untrue and that Olzon herself had agreed to help find a replacement while she was on maternity leave. Later on, Olzon gave several interviews in which she said she never agreed with a replacement, even when she was pregnant, and proposed to the band to postpone the tour, which culminated in her firing. She also added that she was against Jansen joining the band in her period of maternity, mainly because of the difference in their vocal styles.

In a 2015 interview, Holopainen said the band "emerged stronger" from the line-up changes it went through.

Endless Forms Most Beautiful and arrival of Floor Jansen and Troy Donockley (2013–2018) 

In an interview with Metal Hammer in November 2012, Tuomas Holopainen stated that they already had a rehearsal place booked from July 2014 to September 2014, but before they began rehearsing the band members would be taking a break from Nightwish for several months.

On October 9, 2013, Nightwish announced Floor Jansen as the permanent replacement for Olzon. Troy Donockley was also announced as a full-time member, making the band a sextet for the first time. In a later interview, Tuomas said that Donockley's previous work with Nightwish had already made him "much a band member", so the band just "made it official". According to the band's webpage, the band would enter the studio in 2014 to record its eighth full-length album for a 2015 release. At that time, the band had already announced that it would contain Nightwish's longest song to date.

At the end of November, the band released the live album Showtime, Storytime. Despite the recording happening when they were only four members, it is the first Nightwish release to feature Jansen and to have her and Donockley credited as band members. The album also carries a documentary containing the behind-the-scenes of Jansen's first days in the band and the process of replacing Olzon.

In May 2014, Holopainen updated his official website, stating that he and producer Tero "TeeCee" Kinnunen had been recording 12 demos (and possibly three bonus tracks) for the new album in Hattula, Finland. The band expected to start rehearsing in July in Eno, Finland, to complete recording by January 2015, and to release the album in spring of that year, "If everything goes as scheduled". Commenting on the music, Tuomas said:

On August 6, the band announced that founding member and drummer Jukka Nevalainen would not be part of the upcoming album due to his debilitating insomnia. Kai Hahto (Wintersun) would be taking his place on the album and the upcoming tour.

Evolutionary biologist and author Richard Dawkins was announced as a guest star on the album, with Holopainen stating that he had "been so enthusiastic about this kind of literature for the past few months, and will be for the upcoming months, that it's going to come out somehow."

In November, the band filmed a music video for "Élan", one of the tracks of the album. On December 8, the band announced that it would be the first single from the album, which would be released on February 13, 2015.

The new album's cover art and its title, Endless Forms Most Beautiful, were revealed on December 22, and the album was released on March 27, 2015, produced by Tero "TeeCee" Kinnunen. The title for Endless Forms Most Beautiful was taken from the writings of English naturalist Charles Darwin. The album features the participation of London's The Metro Voices choir group, London's Young Musicians Children's Choir, and the Orchestre De Grandeur, led by the esteemed orchestral arranger Pip Williams, who teaches music and music technology at the London College of Music. Professor Richard Dawkins not only narrates the introduction to the album's opener, "Shudder Before the Beautiful", but also the album's closer, "The Greatest Show on Earth", which takes its name from his 2009 book on evolution. In its first week, the album sold 18,342 copies in the US and debuted at 34 on the Billboard 200, making it Nightwish's third album (after Dark Passion Play and Imaginaerum) to chart in this category. In the Czech Republic, the album debuted atop the charts and received gold-status after just two days. The album charted in the top 10 in other countries as well, including Finland, Netherlands, Poland, Austria, and Mexico. To promote the album's release, the band embarked on an Endless Forms Most Beautiful World Tour, which started on April 9, 2015, in New York City and ended on October 9, 2016, in Saitama, Japan.

In July 2015, it was announced that Sonata Arctica's vocalist Tony Kakko would replace Jukka Nevalainen as the band's special guest at the 2015 edition of Rock in Rio. In December 2015, Nightwish became the first Finnish band to headline a show at the Wembley Arena, in London. The sold-out show featured guest performer Richard Dawkins, who spoke his parts on stage. The Tampere and London shows were filmed for a live album release known as Vehicle of Spirit.

On August 20, 2016, the band played a special 20th-anniversary show at Himos Areena in Finland. The show featured original bassist Sami Vänskä on the song "Stargazers" and drummer Jukka Nevalainen on the song "Last Ride of the Day". The band took a break in 2017, during which Jansen was focusing on her first child. Holopainen said that the band would continue between the years of 2018 and 2020, with another album that would continue the themes explored in Endless Forms Most Beautiful.

On June 9, 2017, the band announced that March 9, 2018, would mark not only the debut of a nine-month world tour titled Decades: World Tour, which had concluded in December that same year, but also the release of a new compilation album, titled Decades. The tour featured "rarely heard material" and a special set for fans; on the North American leg of the tour, every audience member was offered the Decades album for free. During the Latin American leg of the tour, the Buenos Aires show was filmed for a live DVD known as Decades: Live in Buenos Aires which was released on December 6, 2019.

Further lineup changes and Human. :II: Nature. (2019–present) 

In July 2018, Holopainen stated that he had written "80 or 90%" of the material for Nightwish's next album, which would consist of ten or eleven songs. He stated that the inspiration for the new album came from the completion of the 2018 self-titled debut album of Auri, a band he created with Donockley and Johanna Kurkela the previous year. Recording would start in July 2019, with a planned spring 2020 release. The band would "use the [orchestral] instrumentation in a different way than before", with Holopainen stating, "You want to search for some new ways of using it so that it doesn't end up sounding the same as before". Jansen stated in November that she believed the recording process would be similar to Endless Forms Most Beautifuls, for which the band went through lengthy rehearsals before starting to record.

On July 15, 2019, it was announced by the band that Kai Hahto would be permanently taking over for Jukka Nevalainen as the band's drummer. In a statement, Nevalainen explained that while he was managing his insomnia very well and having few issues, he did not want to 'push his luck' by returning to the band as a full-time member. He did confirm, however, that he would continue in his role of taking care of band-related business behind the scenes.

On October 31, 2019, Floor Jansen confirmed that recording for the new album had been completed. On December 18, 2019, it was confirmed that Tuomas Holopainen was at Finnvox Studios mixing Nightwish's upcoming studio album, set for release in the first quarter of 2020. Holopainen later confirmed on January 10, 2020, that mixing and mastering for the album had finished and was ready for release, with the album title and other details to be released soon.

The new album's cover and tracklist, along with its title, Human. :II: Nature., were revealed on January 16, 2020, and the album was released on April 10, 2020. The first single of the album, titled "Noise" was released on February 7, 2020, with an accompanying music video. The second single from the album, "Harvest", was released on March 6, 2020, with a lyric video to accompany its release. On the day the album was released, Nightwish released lyric videos for all of the songs on the album. The album debuted in the top 10 charts as number one in Finland, Spain, Switzerland and Germany, as well as being charted in other countries including Canada, Austria, Hungary, Poland and the United States.

Nightwish announced on March 11, 2020, that they had joined a partnership with an international conservation charity organization named World Land Trust. With their announcement was a video that promoted the organization, which in turn features the song "Ad Astra" from their ninth album. When asked about the partnership with the organization in an interview, Floor commented:

On July 10, 2020, a new crab species, the Tanidromites nightwishorum, which was discovered by curator of palaentology Dr. Adiel A. Klompmaker of the Alabama Museum of Natural History, was named in honor of the band, in particular for their 2015 album Endless Forms Most Beautiful. On August 12, 2020, a prehistoric rockshelter called the Alpenglow Rockshelter, that was discovered in Pennsylvania, USA was, too, named for Nightwish, particularly in honor of their ninth track, Alpenglow, from their 2015 album.

On January 12, 2021, Marko Hietala announced his departure from the band, citing his struggles with chronic depression and his disillusionment with the music scene in general. The band released another statement, that there will be a temporary live member to fill in for bass for the tour. In his statement, Hietala wrote:

The band began their world tour in support of the album in May 2021 with an interactive livestream experience in a virtual reality built tavern which featured songs from the album, as well as revealed the identity of the session bass player, Jukka Koskinen via VIP virtual session. Both of the performances had broken records with the first drawing 150,000 viewers and setting it as the most viewed virtual performance in Finland, with the box office exceeding one million in euros. Holopainen and Donockley later confirmed that the virtual performances were recorded, which were later released on DVD on March 11, 2022. The band resumed their tour in Finland in late July 2021 with a "secret" performance in Oulu. The tour was originally scheduled to begin in spring 2020, but due to the COVID-19 pandemic, the band postponed the tour to the next year. The tour is set to conclude in June 2023.

On January 21, 2021, the band were nominated by the Finnish Emma Awards for the categories of Album of the Year, Band of the Year and Viewer's Choice of the Year, winning the category of Metal Album of the Year. The awards ceremony in which they were nominated was held on May 14, 2021, at the Hartwall Arena in Helsinki.

Following a number of summer festivals in Europe, the band announced the addition of Jukka Koskinen as the band's permanent bass player on August 21, 2022.

In April 2021, Holopainen had said in an interview that he has already started sketching drafts for the next Nightwish album. He stated in May 2021 that he had been working on new material for "the past month or two" while he was busy with his side projects Auri and the reunited Darkwoods My Betrothed in which he became a full-time member. He confirmed that the band booked a studio for the next album, which is set to happen in 2023. On March 2, 2022, it was confirmed that Holopainen was in the studio, writing demos for the next Nightwish album, which were later finished in June 2022. Jansen, who is also working on a solo album to be released in 2023, stated on June 10, 2022 that the sound of the upcoming new album will be put in a heavier direction, but will not lose the band's sound while she also wanted to keep the concept for the album a secret. Holopainen confirmed in an interview before the band's performance at Knotfest in Turku, Finland on August 12, 2022, that the band had listened to the demos. Holopainen later confirmed that the next album will be both a follow-up to Human. :II: Nature. and both the third and final part of a trilogy which was started from Endless Forms Most Beautiful, as well as stating that the album will come out around early 2024.

Music

Musical style

Nightwish performs goth-influenced symphonic metal with female vocals. Their music has been also described as symphonic gothic metal which mixes metal, opera, weepy power ballads, and keyboard solos. Although the combination of operatic vocals and melodic heavy metal made Nightwish famous, they don't employ operatic vocals as much as they used to. On the ninth studio album Human. :II: Nature., "Shoemaker" was the only time they tried an operatic vocal. They have also been known to play power metal, folk metal and gothic metal.

The band's music is also known to be complex and layered. Their approach is epic, theatrical and operatic. Critic Steve Huey notes "their rich melodicism, dynamic textures, and theatrical approach to performance make them a unique musical entity"

The usage of a female vocalist has become a sort of trademark, though less so since the outbreak of new female fronted metal bands in the mid-2000s with the popularization of bands such as Evanescence and Within Temptation as well as several gothic metal bands mixing female and male vocals, such as Lacuna Coil, Tristania, Epica and After Forever.

Former bassist and vocalist Marko Hietala describes the style of the band's music as "melodic symphonic metal;" though this is not a view shared by all members of the group, including band composer Tuomas Holopainen, who describes the band as simply symphonic metal. Some critics find that the band had a gothic sound since their debut. The music of Nightwish had been "distinguished by the operatic voice" of soprano Tarja Turunen, a "charismatic frontwoman with a powerful voice". Critics observed that her vocals became less operatic with the release of Once. Following the departure of Tarja Turunen from the group, Nightwish left behind the "signature operatic vocals" of their earlier albums, though the band somewhat reintroduced this style when Floor Jansen became lead singer.

While the music of Nightwish is centered around a female lead singer, the band has also featured some male vocals on their albums ever since their debut release Angels Fall First. This debut album also included "elements of folk music and ambience" that were discarded on their subsequent album Oceanborn. However, the song "Creek Mary's Blood" from the album Once featured some use of folk-oriented Native American melodies, and their 2007 release Dark Passion Play featured folk music elements on the songs "The Islander" and "Last of the Wilds".

Lyrical themes
In the beginning, Holopainen mainly wrote about mythological and fantasy themes,<ref>{{cite web |author=lancelot |url=http://www.yopi.de/rev/206437 |title=Nightwish: Oceanborn --> einfach genial!!! |website=Yopi.de |date=May 11, 2005 |language=de |access-date=August 3, 2007}}</ref> and often used references to "metaphysics and nature". Fantasy novels especially are a big influence on Nightwish's lyrics. Songs such as "Wishmaster," "Elvenpath," and "Wanderlust" make fairly clear references to fantasy novels, in this case the Dragonlance series and J. R. R. Tolkien's The Lord of the Rings. "FantasMic" from Wishmaster is a direct tribute to Walt Disney and Disney animated films, which Holopainen has said are among his influences. Dark Passion Play featured the return to the fantasy theme with songs such as "Sahara", "Whoever Brings the Night" and "7 Days to the Wolves", which is loosely based on Stephen King's novel Wolves of the Calla, the fifth book in the Dark Tower series. The song The Poet and the Pendulum's first section is called "The White Lands of Empathica", which is a reference to the seventh book in the Dark Tower series.

Through the years, the lyrics became more personal. "Dead Boy's Poem" from Wishmaster is a very emotional piece, which Holopainen calls his "legacy and [...] testament for the whole world. [...] I wanted to do this song before I die because I wanted to tell the whole world what I think and feel. It expresses a lot of myself." The personal development became even more obvious on the Wishmaster-successor Century Child. Turunen thinks that the lyrics do not anymore deal "with the dreamland we were used to, but with the brutal reality of life."

"Kuolema Tekee Taiteilijan" (in English, "Death Makes an Artist") from Once describes the experience of loss and its impact on art, "Nemo" deals with the feeling of being lost, while "Dead Gardens" deals with a bout of artist's block Holopainen suffered from. "Creek Mary's Blood" is based on Dee Brown's story of the same name, which presents the situation of Native Americans at the end of the 19th century.
2007's Dark Passion Play included an unusual number of personal songs, including "The Poet and the Pendulum" which has been described as Holopainen's life story, and about being a composer and musician. Another song, "Meadows of Heaven" is a depiction of Holopainen's childhood and the feeling that it'll never return. Two songs, "Bye Bye Beautiful" and "Master Passion Greed" are about ex-member Tarja Turunen and her husband Marcelo Cabuli. Another song on the album, "Cadence of Her Last Breath", is a "very personal song" about running away. The album also contains many references to authors such as Edgar Allan Poe and Walt Whitman.Imaginaerum tracks has different lyrical themes. For example, the song "Ghost River" themes "a duel between the Devil and Mother Gaia", while "Scaretale" themes "childhood nightmares and monsters".

On Endless Forms Most Beautiful lyrical themes included songs about the beauty of the world and everything it has to offer ("Shudder Before The Beautiful"), critic about how some religions restrict people's lives ("Weak Fantasy"), and the meaning of life, which can be something different for all of us ("Élan").

The first disc of Human. :II: Nature. continues the theme of Nightwish's previous album, with the album's theme being based on human nature and how they are as a species, with songs about modern society ("Noise"), life ("Harvest"), the human imagination ("Pan"), and an ode to human empathy ("How's the Heart?").

Although the lyrics of Nightwish generally are serious with dark meanings, they have also produced several less serious songs, including the bonus track "Nightquest", which talks about the band members' (the three original members as well as Nevalainen) connection as musicians, and the "quest" of Nightwish.

Language
Nightwish's debut album Angels Fall First had one song in the Finnish language, but since then the band has only written songs in English, with the only exceptions being "Kuolema tekee taiteilijan" from the Once album (2004), the single "Erämaan viimeinen" (2007), which is a vocal version of the instrumental "Last of the Wilds", and "Taikatalvi" ("Magic Winter") from Imaginaerum (2011). Holopainen thought that he was very uncertain about the lyrics of "Erämaan viimeinen", because he is of the opinion that writing in Finnish is rather hard, and has said that "Finnish [could] quickly sound really cheesy."

Influence

Tuomas Holopainen, writer of most of the band's lyrics and music, says that he gets most of the inspiration for Nightwish's songs from film music. Songs like "Beauty of the Beast" (from Century Child), "Ghost Love Score" (from Once) and "The Poet and the Pendulum" (from Dark Passion Play) are examples of this influence. Holopainen has also said that film music is the music he listens to for leisure. He likes, for example, the musical scores to The Village, Van Helsing, The Chronicles of Narnia: The Lion, the Witch and the Wardrobe and Crimson Tide, and practically everything written by Hans Zimmer. Other songs, such as "Bye Bye Beautiful" (from Dark Passion Play), and "Wish I Had an Angel" (from Once) have elements of industrial metal, and some others, like "The Islander" and "Last of the Wilds" (from Dark Passion Play), "Creek Mary's Blood" (from Once), and the Angels Fall First album have elements of folk music. Bands stated as an influence on Nightwish include Children of Bodom, Theatre of Tragedy, The Gathering, My Dying Bride, Tiamat and The 3rd and the Mortal.

Nightwish has also been noted as a source of inspiration for other bands. Simone Simons, lead singer of Dutch symphonic/gothic metal band Epica, stated that she began singing in a classical style because of Nightwish's 1998 Oceanborn album. Sander Gommans of After Forever said that Nightwish "will certainly influence us in creating new songs". Power metal band Sonata Arctica's lead singer Tony Kakko has explained how much of an influence Nightwish is to him. In December 2015, Metal Hammer Dave Everley described them as "mainland Europe's most successful metal band, give or take a Rammstein".

Band members

Current members
 Tuomas Holopainen – keyboards, piano, synthesizers (1996–present), male vocals (1996–1998)
 Emppu Vuorinen – guitars (1996–present), bass (1997)
 Troy Donockley – uilleann pipes, tin whistle, low whistle, guitars, bouzouki, bodhrán, male vocals (2013–present; session / touring member: 2007–2013)
 Floor Jansen – lead vocals (2013–present; touring member: 2012–2013)
 Kai Hahto – drums, percussion (2019–present; session / touring member: 2014–2019)
 Jukka Koskinen – bass (2022–present; session: 2021–2022)

Former members
 Sami Vänskä – bass (1998–2001)
 Tarja Turunen – lead vocals (1996–2005)
 Anette Olzon – lead vocals (2007–2012)
 Jukka Nevalainen – drums, percussion (1997–2019; hiatus 2014–2019)
 Marko Hietala – bass, male vocals (2001–2021), acoustic guitar (2006–2021)

Former session members
 Samppa Hirvonen – bass (1997–1998, live)
 Marianna Pellinen – keyboards, backing vocals (1997–1998, live)
 Esa Lehtinen – flutes (1997–2000, studio)

Timeline

Discography

 Angels Fall First (1997)
 Oceanborn (1998)
 Wishmaster (2000)
 Century Child (2002)
 Once (2004)
 Dark Passion Play (2007)
 Imaginaerum (2011)
 Endless Forms Most Beautiful (2015)
 Human. :II: Nature.'' (2020)

Tours
 The First Tour of the Angels (1997–1998)
 Summer of Wilderness (1999)
 Oceanborn Europe Tour (1999)
 Wishmaster World Tour (2000–2001)
 World Tour of the Century (2002–2003)
 Once Upon a Tour (2004–2005)
 Dark Passion Play World Tour (2007–2009)
 Imaginaerum World Tour (2012–2013)
 Endless Forms Most Beautiful World Tour (2015–2016)
 Decades: World Tour (2018)
 Human. :II: Nature. World Tour (2021–2023)

See also
 List of best-selling music artists in Finland
 List of heavy metal bands
 List of symphonic metal bands
 Music of Finland
 Rock music in Finland
 Symphonic gothic metal
 Symphonic metal
 Symphonic power metal
 Tarja Turunen discography

References

Citations

General bibliography

External links

 
 Nightwish Shop

 
1996 establishments in Finland
Articles which contain graphical timelines
Finnish power metal musical groups
Finnish symphonic metal musical groups
Finnish gothic metal musical groups
Musical groups established in 1996
Nuclear Blast artists
World Music Awards winners
Female-fronted musical groups